Solo un grande sasso is the second album by the Italian alternative-rock band Verdena, released in 2001.

In September 2001 the album peaked at number 6 in the Italian Chart.

Track list

La tua fretta – 2:35
Spaceman – 4:35
Nova – 7:44
Cara prudenza – 4:15
Onan – 5:12
Starless – 7:00
Miami Safari – 3:35
Nel mio letto – 3:04
1000 anni con Elide – 6:35
Buona risposta – 5:14
Centrifuga – 8:16
Meduse e tappeti – 3:16
Il tramonto degli stupidi (only in the vinyl press)

References

2001 albums
Mercury Records albums
Verdena albums